HMS Staunch was one of 20  (later H-class) destroyers built for the Royal Navy. The destroyer served in the First World War. The Acorn class were smaller than the preceding  but oil-fired and better armed. Launched in 1910, Staunch acted as escort for the royal yacht  at the Cowes Regatta the following year. At the start of the First World War, the vessel served with the Second Destroyer Flotilla of the Grand Fleet as an escort, transferring to the Fifth Destroyer Flotilla as part of the Mediterranean Fleet in 1915. As the year closed, Staunch assisted in the evacuation of troops at the end of the Gallipoli campaign. Despite the conditions, the destroyer managed to transport almost an entire battalion of the Worcestershire Regiment to safety. The destroyer sank, with eight sailors killed.

Design and description

After the preceding coal-burning , the s saw a return to oil-firing. Unlike previous destroyer designs, where the individual yards had been given discretion within the parameters set by the Admiralty, the Acorn class were a set, with the machinery the only major variation between the different ships. This enabled costs to be reduced. The class was later renamed the H class.

Displacement was  normal and  full load. Power was provided by Parsons steam turbines, fed by four Yarrow boilers. Parsons supplied a complex of seven turbines, a high-pressure and two low pressure for high speed, two turbines for cruising and two for running astern, driving three shafts. The high-pressure turbine drove the centre shaft, the remainder being distributed amongst two wing-shafts. Three funnels were fitted, the foremost tall and thin, the central short and thick and the aft narrow.

Armament consisted of two single BL  Mk VIII guns, one carried on the forecastle and another aft. Two single QF 12-pounder  guns were mounted between the first two funnels. Two rotating  torpedo tubes were mounted aft of the funnels, with two reloads carried, and a searchlight fitted between the tubes. The destroyer was later modified to carry a single Vickers QF 3-pounder  anti-aircraft gun and depth charges for anti-submarine warfare. The ship's complement was 72 officers and ratings.

Construction and career
The 20 destroyers of the Acorn class were ordered by the Admiralty under the 1909–1910 Naval Programme. Staunch was laid down at the Dumbarton shipyard of William Denny and Brothers with the year number 920 on 15 January 1910, launched on 29 October and completed on 17 March. The ship was fifth in navy service given the name staunch, which had been first used in 1797. The vessel initially joined the Fourth Destroyer Flotilla. On 5 August 1911, the destroyer escorted the royal yacht  at the Cowes Regatta. Staunch subsequently joined the Second Destroyer Flotilla.

After the British Empire declared war on Germany at the beginning of the First World War in August 1914, the flotilla became part of the Grand Fleet. Between 13 and 15 October, the flotilla supported the battleships of the Grand Fleet in a practice cruise. Soon afterwards, the destroyers were deployed to Devonport to undertake escort and patrol duties, protecting merchant ships against German submarines. January 1915 found the vessel attached the Grand Fleet. On 28 August 1915, the flotilla took part in an anti-submarine patrol, accompanied by battleships and cruisers, but this was unsuccessful at destroying any submarines. However, towards the end of the year, the destroyer was detached from the Grand Fleet.

Leaving Devonport on 13 November, Staunch sailed to the Mediterranean Sea. The ship was attached to the Fifth Destroyer Flotilla as part of the Mediterranean Fleet. Within months, the destroyer was deployed to support the end of the Gallipoli campaign. Royal Navy vessels had successfully removed a large force from the peninsular, but there remained 37,500 troops on 29 December left on the beaches. The Navy organised the evacuation of 22,500 troops, but the combination of weather and geography meant that there were still 15,000 that were left ashore. It was not until 9 January 1916 that the destroyer was able to approach one of the hulks that lay offshore and help the evacuation. The ship succeeded in saving the majority of a battalion of the Worcestershire Regiment.

On 30 October 1917, the destroyer formed part of the support for the monitor  in bombarding troops of the Ottoman Empire stationed north of Gaza. Remained at periscope depth, Wendlandt monitored the flotilla until he found a gap between the anti-submarine nets and the coast. He launched torpedoes at M15 and Staunch. Both ships sank, and eight sailors aboard Staunch were killed. The submarine escaped unscathed.

Pennant numbers

References

Citations

Bibliography

 
 
 
 

 
 

1910 ships
Staunch (1910)
Maritime incidents in 1917
Ships built on the River Clyde
Ships sunk by German submarines in World War I
Staunch (1910)
World War I shipwrecks in the Mediterranean Sea